Berger Foundation or The Berger Foundation may refer to;

 H.N. and Frances C. Berger Foundation, an education and support foundation based in Palm Desert, California
 Jacques-Édouard Berger Foundation, an arts foundation in Switzerland
 Roland Berger Foundation, a human rights foundation in Munich, Germany